Auburn is a community in the Canadian province of Nova Scotia, located in Kings County, situated west of Aylesford. The second oldest Anglican church in Nova Scotia is situated there, consecrated in 1790 by Bishop Inglis. Modelled on Christopher Wren's London church designs, St. Marys Anglican Church is known as "The Little Wren Church". Complete with a Palladian window over the chancel, it most closely resembles St James's Church, Piccadilly.

References

Communities in Kings County, Nova Scotia